Efibula is a genus of 16 species of crust fungi in the family Irpicaceae.

Taxonomy
The genus was circumscribed by Sheng-Hua Wu in 1990 with Efibula tropica as the type species. Efibula contains Phlebia-like fungi without clamp connections. Although traditionally classified in the family Phanerochaetaceae, recent molecular phylogenetic analysis supports the placement of Efibula  in the Irpicaceae.

Species
, Index Fungorum accepts 16 species in Efibula:
Efibula americana Floudas & Hibbett (2015)
Efibula aurata (Bourdot & Galzin) Zmitr. & Spirin (2006)
Efibula avellanea (Bres.) Sheng H.Wu (1990)
Efibula bubalina (Burds.) Zmitr. & Spirin (2006)
Efibula clarkii Floudas & Hibbett (2015)
Efibula cordylines (G.Cunn.) Zmitr. & Spirin (2006)
Efibula corymbata (G.Cunn.) Zmitr. & Spirin (2006)
Efibula deflectens (P.Karst.) Sheng H.Wu (1990)
Efibula ginnsii (Sheng H.Wu) Zmitr. & Spirin (2006)
Efibula gracilis Floudas & Hibbett (2015)
Efibula lutea Sheng H.Wu (1990)
Efibula pallidovirens (Bourdot & Galzin) Sheng H.Wu (1990)
Efibula subodontoidea (Sheng H.Wu) Zmitr. & Spirin (2006)
Efibula subquercina (Henn.) Zmitr. & Spirin (2006)
Efibula tropica Sheng H.Wu (1990)
Efibula tuberculata (P.Karst.) Zmitr. & Spirin (2006)
Efibula verruculosa (Hjortstam & Ryvarden) Kotir. & Saaren. (1993)

The genus Roseograndinia was created in 2005 to contain the fungus once proposed for transfer into Efibula as Efibula rosea.

References

Irpicaceae
Polyporales genera
Taxa described in 1990